Irène Galter (16 September 1931 – 7 June 2018) was an Italian actress.

Life and career
Born in Merano as Irene Patuzzi, during the first half of the 1950s Galter was called the "ideal girlfriend" of Italians. She was casually discovered in a shop where she worked as a clerk by Giuseppe De Santis, who launched her career in 1952 with the neorealist film Rome 11:00. After a number of successful films, she married the South Tyrolean entrepreneur Otto Lughin and retired from showbusiness.

Selected filmography
 Rome 11:00 (1952)
 The City Stands Trial (1952)
 Falsehood (1952)
 When You Read This Letter (1953)
 Trouble for the Legion (1953)
 Empty Eyes (1953)
 100 Years of Love (1954)
 Schiava del peccato (1954)
 Songs of Italy (1955)
 Heaven Is Never Booked Up (1955)
 Le avventure di Giacomo Casanova (1955)
 Liane, Jungle Goddess (1956)
 Love and Troubles (1958)

References

External links 

 

1931 births
2018 deaths
Italian film actresses
People from Merano
Italian television actresses
20th-century Italian actresses